420 IPC is a 2021 Indian Hindi-language suspense drama film directed and written by Manish Gupta. Produced by Zee Studios and Rajesh Kejriwal and Gurpal Sachar with the production house Kyoorius Digital P.L. It stars Vinay Pathak, Ranvir Shorey, Gul Panag and Rohan Vinod Mehra in pivotal roles. The film premiered on 17 December 2021 on ZEE5.

Plot 
The story revolves around a chartered accountant Bansi Keswani (Vinay Pathak) gets arrested for an economic offence, Penal Code 420 concerns cheating.

Cast 

 Vinay Pathak as Bansi Keswani
 Ranvir Shorey as Parsi public prosecutor Savak Jamshedji
 Gul Panag as Pooja
 Rohan Vinod Mehra as Birbal Chaudhary
 Arif Zakaria as Neeraj Sinha
Shush Kalra as Amit
Sanjay Gurbaxani as Judge

Releases 
ZEE5 has announced the launch of trailer on 1 December 2021 and the film will be released on 17 December 2021.

Reception 
Joginder Tuteja of ABP News gave it 3.5/5 stars stating that the film is a realistic drama that could be a nail-biting thriller in an Abbas-Mustan World. Watch the movie closely, especially the last 15 minutes that wrap so quickly. Overall, the film has lots of details packed within 90 mins making for an exciting watch.

Hiren Kotwani of The Times of India has given 3/5 stars stating that the film is an engaging watch. Director has not wasted any time on footage in getting the story from the first frame and handled the narrative skillfully with a few twists. It is a good watch without a lag or unnecessary boring elements.

Manoj Vashisth of Jagran has given 3/5 stars stating that the film is a great court story, good performance and without noise. It does not look incomplete or stretched. All the actors have given justice to their characters with good performance. The simplicity and reality of the scenes were impressive.

References

External links 
 420 IPC at ZEE5
 

2021 drama films